Mrs. Atkinson is a  painting (portrait) by Gwen John. It is in the collection of the Metropolitan Museum of Art.

Description and interpretation
The work depicts John's cleaning woman, Mrs. Atkinson, sitting in a room covered with flocked wallpaper.  There is a sheep skull on the mantelpiece, though this is not thought to have symbolic meaning.

Simon Schama writes that she is "glancing anxiously sideways, uncertain of what is wanted of her." The painting was exhibited at the New English Art Club in the spring of 1900, marking a strong phase of her career that also saw her Self-portrait on display there about that time. It is considered among the "carefully executed tonal paintings of rather detailed genre subjects" in her first mature oil works.

References

Metropolitan Museum of Art 2017 drafts
Paintings in the collection of the Metropolitan Museum of Art
Portraits